Bald face or Baldface may refer to:

 a variety of horse marking
 Baldface-Royce Range,  a mountain range in western Maine and eastern New Hampshire, U.S.
 Baldface Mountain, British Columbia, Canada
 North Baldface a mountain in New Hampshire, U.S.
 South Baldface a mountain in New Hampshire, U.S.

See also
Boldface (disambiguation)
Bald-faced hornet
 Blue-faced rail or bald-faced rail, a bird